János Romanek (born 28 March 1966) is a retired Hungarian football midfielder.

References

1966 births
Living people
Hungarian footballers
Budapest Honvéd FC players
Dunaújváros FC players
Vác FC players
Pécsi MFC players
FC DAC 1904 Dunajská Streda players
2. Liga (Slovakia) players
Szolnoki MÁV FC footballers
Association football midfielders
Hungarian expatriate footballers
Expatriate footballers in Slovakia
Hungarian expatriate sportspeople in Slovakia